Leyla Kuh (also Romanized as 'Leylā Kūh; also known as Leyleh Kooh, Leyleh Kūh, Leylī Kūh, Līlehkūh, and Līlkūh) is a village in Divshal Rural District, in the Central District of Langarud County, Gilan Province, Iran. At the 2006 census, its population was 1,692, in 477 families.

References 

Populated places in Langarud County